"Where's the Dress" is a song by American country music singers Moe Bandy and Joe Stampley. It was released in 1984 as a single from The Good Ol' Boys — Alive and Well, their collaborative album on Columbia Records. The song is a satire of the English pop band Culture Club.

Content
"Where's the Dress" was the first collaborative effort between Moe Bandy and Joe Stampley since their 1981 album Hey Joe! Hey Moe!, which included the singles "Hey Joe (Hey Moe)" and "Honky Tonk Queen". The song is a parody of Culture Club and its lead singer Boy George's androgynous fashion styles, with the two singers pondering adopting a similar fashion sense in order to become more successful. Joe Stampley's son, Tony, is one of the song's co-writers, and Blake Mevis is the song's producer. To promote the song, Bandy and Stampley wore dresses and earrings when distributing the singles to radio stations; they dressed similarly on the cover of the single.

While Boy George himself otherwise liked the song, he later sued Bandy and Stampley for incorporating the intro of "Karma Chameleon" into the song without his permission. The three parties later settled the matter out of court.

Music video
The song also featured a music video, directed by Rod Thompson and produced by Jim Owens. In 1985, it won the award for Best Country Video at the American Video Awards. Similarly to the song's concept, the video features the two singers cross-dressing.

Chart performance

References

1984 songs
1984 singles
Columbia Records singles
Moe Bandy songs
Joe Stampley songs
Male vocal duets
Satirical songs
Songs about musicians
Culture Club
Songs about cross-dressing